Središče is a small village in the Municipality of Moravske Toplice in the Prekmurje region of Slovenia, by the border with Hungary. Središče has a population of 66 people; it has one church, a firehouse, and a cultural association (Kulturno društvo Antal Ferenc).

Mass grave
Središče is the site of a mass grave associated with the Second World War or its aftermath. The Središče Mass Grave lies northeast of the village, in an abandoned and overgrown part of the village cemetery. It contains the remains of three Hungarians who were shot while crossing the border illegally.

References

Gallery

External links

Središče on Geopedia

Populated places in the Municipality of Moravske Toplice